Viktor Vladimirovich Ponedelnik (22 May 1937 – 5 December 2020) was a Russian footballer and manager, who played for the Soviet Union national team.

Biography
Ponedelnik first started playing for a local team, Rostselmash, in 1956. In 1958, he switched to SKA Rostov-on-Don and was invited to join the Soviet national team. In the 1960 European Championship, the only major Championship ever won by the Soviet Union, Ponedelnik headed home the winning goal in extra time in the final game against Yugoslavia. Ponedelnik retired in 1966 after gaining weight and undergoing surgery for appendicitis. He scored 20 (according to some accounts, 21) goals in 29 games for his country.

In later years, Ponedelnik worked as a coach, a sports journalist, an editor of a sports publication, and an advisor to the President of the Russian Federation. Later, a journalist, editor, and in-chief of the weekly Football. He received numerous awards for his contribution to Soviet and Russian sport. He was married and had three children and four grandchildren.

In Rostov-on-Don at the stadium, Olimp-2 28 August 2015 a monument depicting a young Ponedelnik with the cup in his hands.

Ponedelnik died on 5 December 2020 at the age of 83. He was the last surviving member of the 1960 European Nations' Cup winning squad of Soviet Union, that became the inaugural European Champions at international level.

Honours

International
USSR
 UEFA European Championship: 1960, runner-up: 1964

Individual
 UEFA European Championship: Golden Boot / Team of the Tournament 1960
 Honored Master of Sports
 Order of the Badge of Honour: 1980 
 Order of Friendship: 1997
 Cavalier of the Order of the Ruby League For Merit: 2009
 Order For Services to the Rostov Oblast: 2013

Books 
 My Love, Football (1970)
 Penalty Area (1977)
 Ball, the Gate (1980)
 Confessions of a Central Striker (1987)

References

External links
Biography from the official website of the Russian national team 
Unofficial biography  

1937 births
2020 deaths
Soviet footballers
Russian footballers
Soviet Top League players
FC Rostov players
1960 European Nations' Cup players
1962 FIFA World Cup players
1964 European Nations' Cup players
UEFA European Championship-winning players
Association football forwards
Soviet Union international footballers
FC SKA Rostov-on-Don players
PFC CSKA Moscow players
FC Spartak Moscow players
Soviet football managers
FC Rostov managers
Sportspeople from Rostov-on-Don
Russian sports journalists
Honoured Masters of Sport of the USSR